Hydrophilus insularis is a species of water scavenger beetle in the family Hydrophilidae. It is found from northern South America north throughout the Caribbean, Central America, and Mexico into southern Arizona, California, Texas, and Florida in the United States.

References

Hydrophilinae
Beetles described in 1840
Taxa named by François-Louis Laporte, comte de Castelnau